Luke Becker (born 11 February 1999) is a motorcycle speedway rider from the United States.

Career
Becker began his British career riding for Wolverhampton Wolves in 2019. Unable to ride during 2020 because of Covid-19 cancelled season, he continued to ride for Wolverhampton during the SGB Premiership 2021. 

In 2022, he rode for the Wolverhampton Wolves in the SGB Premiership 2022. After being named Wolves Rider of the Year he signed for the club for the 4th consecutive season, competing in the SGB Premiership 2023.

International
Becker made his international debut for the United States in the 2019 Speedway of Nations, scoring 11 points. He also represented the United States in 2021 and 2022.

Major results

World Team Championships
2019 Speedway of Nations - =10th 
2021 Speedway of Nations - =8th 
2022 Speedway of Nations - =10th

References 

1999 births
Living people
American speedway riders
Wolverhampton Wolves riders